{{Infobox Hurler  
| code= Hurler arts 
| sport = Hurler  
| image =
| name = Donal Murray
| irish = Dónall Ó Muirí
| fullname = 
| feet = 5
| inches = 11
| occupation = Student 
| nickname = 
| county = limerick  
| province = Munster  
| club = 
| clcounty = 5 time Iimerick champion 
| clprovince= Four time Leinster champion 
| clallireland = 6 time all Ireland champion .

References

1956 births
Living people
Croom hurlers
Limerick inter-county hurlers